The Odon is a river in the Calvados department, in Normandy, northwestern France. It is 47 km long and is a left tributary of the Orne. The river passes through Jurques, Aunay-sur-Odon, Baron-sur-Odon, Bretteville-sur-Odon, Épinay-sur-Odon, Grainville-sur-Odon, Parfouru-sur-Odon, Tournay-sur-Odon and Tourville-sur-Odon. It flows into the Orne in Caen.

References

Rivers of Normandy
Rivers of France
Rivers of Calvados (department)